Prince Regent is a British period television series made and transmitted by the BBC in 1979. It depicts the life of George IV from his youth time as prince regent and his reign as King. It consists of eight episodes of 50 minutes.

The series stars Peter Egan as George IV throughout his youth, regency, and first year of his reign, with Nigel Davenport as King George III, and Susannah York as Maria Fitzherbert. It was primarily directed by Michael Simpson, with Michael Hayes directing the fourth episode, and primarily written by Robert Muller, as well as Nemone Lethbridge, Ian Curteis, and Reg Gadney in other episodes.

Episodes

Cast
 Peter Egan as George, Prince of Wales, later King George IV
 Nigel Davenport as King George III
 Keith Barron as Charles James Fox
 Frances White as Queen Charlotte
 Susannah York as Maria Fitzherbert
 Dinah Stabb as Princess Caroline, later Queen Caroline
 Bosco Hogan as Prince Frederick, Duke of York and Albany
 David Horovitch as Lt. Col. Lake
 Clive Merrison as Richard Brinsley Sheridan
 Barbara Shelley as Lady Isabella Hertford
 Caroline Blakiston as Lady Frances Jersey
 Cherie Lunghi as Princess Charlotte of Wales
 Patsy Kensit as Young Charlotte
 Rupert Frazer as Prince Leopold
 David Collings as William Pitt the Younger
 Murray Head as George Canning
 David Pinner as Prince William, Duke of Clarence
 Ralph Nossek as Dr Francis Willis
 Katy Durham-Matthews as Princess Mary
 Chrissy Iddon as Mary Robinson
 Robert Hartley as Lord Jersey
 Pat Nye as Frau Schwellenberg

Awards
The series won the make-up award (Toni Chapman) at the 1979 BAFTA television awards, and was nominated in the design (Barry Newbury, Barrie Dobbins), costume design (Raymond Hughes) and television cameraman (Rodney Taylor) categories.

DVD release

Prince Regent is available on DVD in the UK through Simply Media.

References

External links
 

1979 British television series debuts
1979 British television series endings
1970s British drama television series
BBC television dramas
BBC television royalty dramas
Cultural depictions of George III
Cultural depictions of George IV
English-language television shows